The Queen Bee Mill is a ruined mill complex located in Falls Park in Sioux Falls, South Dakota. The mill was built between 1879 and 1881 under the guidance of politician Richard F. Pettigrew, who believed that Sioux Falls could harness the power of the Big Sioux River for local industry. When it opened in 1881, the mill could process 1200 barrels of grain per day, and its elevator could hold 130,000 bushels; it also had connections to all five of the city's rail lines. Business at the mill could never meet its capacity, however, and it closed only two years after it opened due to bankruptcy. The mill passed through several owners after it closed; while several attempted to reopen it, none succeeded, and the building eventually became a warehouse. A fire destroyed the complex in 1956; the foundations of the mill and grain elevator are all that remain at the site.

The mill was added to the National Register of Historic Places on August 1, 1984.

References

External links
 

Agricultural buildings and structures on the National Register of Historic Places in South Dakota
Industrial buildings completed in 1881
Grinding mills in South Dakota
National Register of Historic Places in Sioux Falls, South Dakota
Grinding mills on the National Register of Historic Places
1881 establishments in Dakota Territory
1956 disestablishments in South Dakota
Demolished buildings and structures in South Dakota